Heart Beats of Long Ago is a 1911 American short silent drama film directed by D. W. Griffith, starring George Nichols and featuring Blanche Sweet. The film is preserved in the Library of Congress by paper print.

Cast
 George Nichols as The Father
 Wilfred Lucas as The Lover
 Donald Crisp as Courtier
 Blanche Sweet
 Kate Toncray as Lady-in-Waiting

See also
 D. W. Griffith filmography
 Blanche Sweet filmography

References

External links

1911 films
1911 short films
American silent short films
Biograph Company films
American black-and-white films
1911 drama films
Films directed by D. W. Griffith
Silent American drama films
1910s American films